Chad Grainger (born 23 September 1972) is a South African cricketer. He played in 30 first-class and 25 List A matches from 1991/92 to 1998/99.

See also
 List of Boland representative cricketers

References

External links
 

1972 births
Living people
South African cricketers
Boland cricketers
Easterns cricketers
Northerns cricketers
Gauteng cricketers
Cricketers from Johannesburg